Ispatinow Island is an island in Northern Saskatchewan, Canada; the largest island on Cree Lake.  The Cree Lake (Crystal Lodge) Airport is located on the island, owned and operated by Crystal Lodge Cree Lake; primarily supporting Crystal Lodge, a seasonal fly-in lodge located on the island.

References

Uninhabited islands of Saskatchewan
Lake islands of Saskatchewan